Shireen Elaine Crutchfield is an American actress and singer. best known as the lead singer of the R&B trio The Good Girls from 1989 to the present. Crutchfield is also known for her acting roles as Jace in Dark Angel and Hot Boyz.

Biography
Born in Cambridge, Massachusetts, she was raised in Los Angeles where she graduated from St. Bernard High School in 1988.  She became the lead singer of the R&B group The Good Girls from the late 1980s through the early 1990s. She modeled for Nous Models in Los Angeles. She has made guest appearances on shows such as The Steve Harvey Show and The Jamie Foxx Show.  She has been seen in a campaign for Ford vehicles. She has two children with actor Davis Henry, to whom she was married from 2001 to 2005.

Filmography

Film and TV Movies

Television

References

External links

American film actresses
American television actresses
Female models from Massachusetts
20th-century American actresses
21st-century American actresses
Living people
Actresses from Cambridge, Massachusetts
21st-century American singers
21st-century American women singers
Year of birth missing (living people)